Xcel Energy Inc. is a U.S. regulated electric utility and natural gas delivery company based in Minneapolis, Minnesota, serving more than 3.7 million electric customers and 2.1 million natural gas customers across parts of eight states (Colorado, Minnesota, Wisconsin, Michigan, North Dakota, South Dakota, Texas and New Mexico). It consists of four operating subsidiaries: Northern States Power-Minnesota, Northern States Power-Wisconsin, Public Service Company of Colorado, and Southwestern Public Service Co.

In December 2018, Xcel Energy announced it would deliver 100 percent clean, carbon-free electricity by 2050, with an 80 percent carbon reduction by 2035 (from 2005 levels). This makes Xcel the first major US utility to set such a goal.

History 

Xcel Energy was built on three companies: Minneapolis-based Northern States Power Company (NSP), Denver-based Public Service Company of Colorado (PSCo), and Amarillo-based Southwestern Public Service (SPS). Southwestern Public Service Co. (SPS) dates its origins to 1904 and the Pecos Valley in New Mexico when Maynard Gunsell received an electricity franchise for the city of Roswell, New Mexico and its 2,000 residents. The financial strain of creating this new enterprise soon overwhelmed him and he sold the franchise to W.H. Gillenwater, who named his utility the Roswell Electric Light Co. He later sold the company to an investment firm in Cleveland, Ohio, which already owned the Roswell Gas Co.

Northern States Power Company's timeline begins with the organization of the Washington County Light & Power Co. in 1909. When H. M. Byllesby began building his utility holding company across the Northwestern region of the US, he renamed it the Consumers Power Co. in 1910 and which was renamed the Northern States Power Co. in 1916. While the bulk of NSP's territory grew across central and southern Minnesota (starting from the Twin Cities), it acquired territory in North Dakota (centering on Fargo, Grand Forks, and Minot) and extended southwest into South Dakota (centering on Sioux Falls). NSP's system also extended east into Wisconsin, but because of utility ownership laws in that state, it was operated as an entity separate from the rest of the company.

Public Service Company of Colorado (PSCo) was formed in 1923 to provide an electric generating station for the Denver area.  By 1924, it had acquired most of the electric companies in northern and central Colorado. Originally a subsidiary of Cities Service Company, it became an independent autonomous operation in November 1943.  By this time, it served 80 percent of Colorado's gas and electricity needs. As demand for energy continued to grow, so did PSCo.  Eventually, the company merged with SPS to form New Century Energies (NCE) in 1995.

Northern States Power and Wisconsin Energy Corporation had planned to merge into a new outfit that was to be called Primergy - but in 1997, the merger fell through because of the time it was taking to gain the required approvals from state and federal agencies. After the failed Primergy merger, NSP (both the Minnesota and Wisconsin companies) merged with New Century Energies to form Xcel Energy.  In 2005, Xcel sold Cheyenne Light, Fuel and Power to Black Hills Corporation.  Cheyenne Light, Fuel and Power had been a subsidiary of PSCo since the 1920s, and had become an operating company of NCE after the merger with SPS.

In December 2018, Xcel Energy became the first major US utility to pledge to go carbon-free, aiming for 80% carbon reduction by 2030, and 100% reduction by 2050.

Utility industry magazine Utility Dive awarded Xcel Energy its 2018 "Utility of the Year" award for its plans for add 12 wind farms, its project with Google to develop new ways for customers to personalize energy management, and its plan to retire 50 percent of its coal-powered capacity by 2026 (and replacing it with a combination of renewable energy, efficiency, and natural gas).

On May 20, 2019, Xcel Energy announced its intent to close all of its remaining coal-fired plants in Minnesota by 2030 while compensating by increasing solar production capacity by 1,400%. It also declared its plans to continue operating its Monticello nuclear plant near Monticello, Minnesota until at least 2040.

On March 16, 2023, Xcel Energy announced that a significant unplanned release of radioactive water from its Monticello nuclear power plant took place on November 21, 2022, which was reported only to state and federal authorities but was concealed from the public until now. Xcel estimated the leak to be 400 thousand gallons of contaminated water containing radioactive tritium. The leak occurred in a water pipe that runs between two buildings.

Generation portfolio 
Across Xcel Energy's eight-state service area, 49% of the power provided in 2021 came from carbon-free sources: biomass, hydroelectric and nuclear plants, solar panels and wind turbines.

Xcel Energy currently has 13 coal plants with a capacity of 7,697 MW. Seven of those plants are operated in Colorado. Xcel Energy owns and operates three wind farms. In October 2011, Xcel Energy set a world record for electricity from wind power, with an hourly penetration of 55.6% of production from wind.

Xcel Energy generates over 500 megawatts of hydroelectric power from 27 plants in Wisconsin, Minnesota, and Colorado. This accounts for only four percent of their electricity generation. They also purchase large amounts of hydro-generated electricity from Manitoba Hydro.

Biomass electricity comes from organic fuel sources. Xcel Energy has contracts for about 110 megawatts of electricity from biomass generators. Two in northern Minnesota are fueled by forest harvest residue, such as treetops and limbs. A third facility, brought on line in 2007 in western Minnesota, generates power using turkey litter.

Xcel Energy's Bay Front plant in Ashland, Wisconsin, is a three-unit generating station that has become a model for the creative use of fuels: coal, waste wood, railroad ties, discarded tires, natural gas, and petroleum coke.  Two of the three Bay Front operating units already use biomass as their primary fuel.  Xcel Energy recently proposed a plan to install biomass gasification technology at Bay Front. The waste-to-energy facilities use waste that would otherwise end up in landfills. The Wisconsin waste-to-energy plant burns wood waste in combination with refuse-derived fuel (RDF).

Xcel Energy owns and operates two nuclear power plants: 
 Monticello Nuclear Generating Plant near Monticello, Minnesota
 Prairie Island Nuclear Generating Plant near Red Wing, Minnesota 
and stores the spent fuel from these nuclear plants on site in independent spent fuel storage installations. (ISFSIs).

System information and transmission 
Xcel Energy operates the fourth largest transmission system in the United States, spanning 10 states. In 2011, Xcel Energy's transmission system was worth $3.3 billion.

The transmission system is operated on a non-discriminatory basis under the open access requirements of the Federal Government. This means that all wholesale buyers and sellers of electricity can use the transmission system under the same terms and conditions used to serve Xcel Energy's own retail customers.  The transmission lines are utilized to carry 115,000 volts, 230,000 volts, and 345,000 volts.  There is also a 500,000 volt transmission line that runs from the Dorsey Substation outside of Winnipeg, Manitoba in Canada to the Chisago Substation located in Chisago County just north of St. Paul, Minnesota.

Grid security 
In 2017, Xcel Energy partnered with the Financial Services Information Sharing and Analysis Center to create a new "threat information sharing community" intended to share cyber and physical security intelligence with the energy sector. The new community is called the Energy Analytic Security Exchange (EASE). It is run by the FS-ISAC Sector Services team; FS-ISAC is an organization that gathers cyber and physical risk intelligence for the financial services industry. Additionally, the North American Electric Reliability Council (NERC) manages the Electricity Information Sharing and Analysis Center, which is another resource that the energy sector uses to gather threat intelligence.

Advanced Grid in Colorado 
In 2016, Xcel Energy announced the Advanced Grid Intelligence and Security (AGIS) initiative, a long-term effort related to power reliability, distributed generation, and information sharing with customers. Through the initiative, Xcel would build an "intelligent grid" in Colorado in order to improve grid security. The company filed a request for permission with the Colorado Public Utilities Commission for the program, which would cost $500 million.

Programs 
Since 1998, Xcel Energy's Windsource program has allowed customers to designate that part or all of their electricity comes from a renewable energy source. In 2015, about 96,000 people were enrolled in Windsource. In 2011, more than 2.3 million electric and 261,800 natural gas customers took part in Xcel Energy's energy efficiency programs for homes and businesses.

Xcel Energy also offers customers incentives to install solar panels. At the end of 2011, more than 10,600 photovoltaic systems had been installed, with a capacity of about 121 megawatts (DC). In early 2011, Xcel Energy suspended the solar rebate program before reaching a settlement a month later with representatives of solar power companies to restore the solar incentive program until it is fully reviewed by the Public Utilities Commission.

Controversies
On August 1, 2002, Xcel Energy Inc. was sued because of engaging in "round-trip" energy trades that provided no economic benefit for the company, and because the company lacked the necessary internal controls to adequately monitor the trading of its power. Xcel paid $80,000,000 in a settlement.

The Cabin Creek Fire occurred on October 2, 2007, at Xcel Energy's Hydropower Generation plant in Georgetown, Colorado. On June 1, 2011, Federal prosecutors opened their charges that Xcel Energy was criminally liable for the deaths of the five RPI workers. On June 28, the jury found Xcel Energy not guilty. On December 19, 2011, RPI Coating pleaded guilty to workplace safety violations and paid $1.55 million in a cash settlement. The company took responsibility for the deaths of five workers and the injuries to three. The U.S. Chemical Safety and Hazard Investigation Board conducted an investigation of the incident. Its report can be found on the CSB website. It is considered one of the worst unmitigated incidents to occur in a permit-required confined space.

The parent company to Xcel Energy, and later Xcel Energy itself have operated the Prairie Island Nuclear Power Plant since 1973. Over that time, nuclear waste produced by the power plant has been stored adjacent to the Prairie Island Indian Community. The homes of some members of the community are within 600 yards of the nuclear waste containment site and, sitting within the banks of the Mississippi River, the island is very vulnerable to seasonal flooding. While in 1991, the Minnesota Public Utilities Commission capped the storage of nuclear waste on the island to 17 casks, the legislature has since permitted this number to increase. Environmentalists and members of the Prairie Island Indian Community have been working since 1994 to have this nuclear waste transported away from their reservation due to the combined risk of the temporary design of the storage facility, unpredictable flooding and single evacuation road in the event nuclear waste is released from containment.

See also 
 Plant X, Lamb County, Texas

References

External links 

 

 Responsiblebynature.com
 connect.xcelenergy.com
 Xcel Energy Inc EDGAR Filing History

 
Companies based in Minneapolis
Companies formerly listed on the New York Stock Exchange
Companies listed on the Nasdaq
Companies in the Dow Jones Utility Average
Electric power companies of the United States
Hydroelectric power companies of the United States
Natural gas companies of the United States
Nuclear power companies of the United States